The 2005–06 Wichita State Shockers men's basketball team represented Wichita State University as a member of the Missouri Valley Conference during the 2005–06 NCAA Division I men's basketball season. The team was led by head coach Mark Turgeon in his sixth season at the school. The Shockers finished atop the MVC regular season standings by 2 games, but lost in the semifinal round of the MVC Tournament. Wichita State received an at-large bid to the NCAA tournament – the school's first bid since 1988. Playing as No. 7 seed in the East region, the team defeated No. 10 seed Seton Hall and No. 2 seed Tennessee to reach the Sweet Sixteen for the first time in 25 years. The run would end there, however, as the Shockers fell to cinderella George Mason in the East regional semi-final.

Roster

Schedule and results

|-
!colspan=9 style=| Regular season

|-
!colspan=9 style=| MVC Tournament

|-
!colspan=9 style=| NCAA Tournament

Awards and honors 
Paul Miller – MVC Player of the Year

References 

Wichita State
Wichita State
Wichita State Shockers men's basketball seasons
Wichita State Shockers men's basketball
Wichita State Shockers men's basketball